Christian Lietzmann (2 October 1955 – September 2006) was a German swimmer who won two silver medals at the 1974 European Aquatics Championships, in the 200 m and 400 m medley. He competed in the same events at the 1972 Summer Olympics, but was eliminated in the preliminaries.

References

1955 births
German male swimmers
Swimmers at the 1972 Summer Olympics
Olympic swimmers of East Germany
2006 deaths
European Aquatics Championships medalists in swimming
Male medley swimmers
People from Görlitz
Sportspeople from Saxony
20th-century German people
21st-century German people